Bitten may refer to:

 Bitten (film), a 2008 film
 Bitten (novel), a 2001 novel by Kelley Armstrong
 Bitten (TV series), a 2014 television series
 Bitten, an anthology book by RL Stine that contains Dangerous Girls and The Taste of Night
 Bitten, a fashion line created by actress Sarah Jessica Parker

See also

 Bight (disambiguation)
 Bit (disambiguation)
 Bite (disambiguation)
 Byte
 Nibble (disambiguation)